InPhase Technologies was a technology company developing holographic storage devices and media, based in Longmont, Colorado. InPhase was spun out from Bell Labs in 2000. Their technology promises multiple terabyte storage. In May 2008, the company first reader, tapestry 300r, offered customers a storage capacity of 300 GB, with transfer rates of 20 MB/s in read write mode. However, the company has failed several times to release the reader on-schedule after previously setting release dates of late 2006, and then February 2007. As a result of these delays, InPhase was forced to cut a number of its workforce; currently there is no release date for the drive and storage media visible.

InPhase Technologies currently holds the record for "highest commercial data storage" by achieving 515 Gbit per square inch of media. Most recently the company broke the 1 terabyte benchmark.

In February 2008, InPhase Technologies was granted a joint patent with video game company Nintendo for a flexure-based scanner for angle-based multiplexing in a holographic storage system.

On March 16, 2010, Signal Lake Venture Capital acquired a majority equity stake in the remains of InPhase. In 2010, InPhase acquired digital holographic storage media manufacturing equipment from Hitachi Maxell in Tokyo, Japan. In 2011, Signal Lake, on behalf of InPhase, acquired the assets of DSM AG in Westerstede, Germany, so InPhase has rights for designing, developing, manufacturing, and supporting digital libraries (autoloaders that can hold one disk drive and fifteen disks with a robot that moves media between slots and disk drives, or libraries that can hold four disk drives and up to two thousand one hundred forty disks) and a robot picker that moves media between slots and disk drives, to be bundled with sales of drives and media.

On October 17, 2011, InPhase Technologies filed for bankruptcy protection to reorganize under Chapter 11, Title 11, United States Code. Much of the blame for InPhase's bankruptcy was placed on Steven Socolof as lead investor who demanded that CEO Nelson Diaz produce a reliable product in one year three years in a row, and both ignored the engineers' warning that the product was not ready for market, while Nelson Diaz was on full pay while all other employees worked for minimum wage.

All of the InPhase assets were sold at auction in March 2012. Akonia Holographics acquired the InPhase assets, including the critical equipment and know-how, and all of the intellectual property. Akonia Holographics, LLC was officially launched on August 10, 2012 after closing on a $10.8 million investment round. On August 30, 2018, Apple Inc. announced it was acquiring Akonia Holographics.

References

External links
inphase-technologies.com
akoniaholographics.com

2000 establishments in Colorado
2012 disestablishments in Colorado
American companies established in 2000
American companies disestablished in 2012
Apple Inc. acquisitions
Computer companies established in 2000
Computer companies disestablished in 2012
Defunct computer companies of the United States
Holographic data storage